The Ceiba Fire Station, at 226 Lauro Piñero Avenue in Ceiba, Puerto Rico, was built in 1954.  It was listed on the National Register of Historic Places in 2013.

Fire hoses were cleaned and hung to dry on its second floor terrace.

References

Art Deco architecture in Puerto Rico
Government buildings completed in 1954
1954 establishments in Puerto Rico
Ceiba, Puerto Rico
Fire stations on the National Register of Historic Places in Puerto Rico